Municipium Dardanorum or Municipium Dardanicum was a Roman mining town whose life lasted from the 2nd to the 4th century AD, that was connected with the workings of (Metalla Dardanica). Its remains are situated in the northern part of Kosovo, located approximately 27 kilometres north of Mitrovica, about 65 km northeast of Ulpiana in the Municipality of Leposavic, localized in the village of Sočanica in the province of Moesia Superior, later the Roman province of Dardania.

Location 

The site has excellent geography, located between the Ibar and Sočanica rivers flowing one side, and surrounded by the Rogozna and Kopaonik mountains on the other side. The surrounding area used to be rich in precious metals (gold and silver), and because of these natural resources, the occupancy grew from a small settlement to one of the most important ancient urban centers, very active during Roman rule. When consulting written sources and ancient literature, or even Roman itineraries, there is not even one written word in regard to this site's existence. Nevertheless, the settlement's ancient occupation was verified with systematic research and investigation, carried out from 1960-1961 and 1963-1965. Archaeological excavations were carried out in the eastern part of the settlement, where a Roman forum, horrea, urban basilica, features of a Roman bath, details of auxiliary objects and a northern necropolis, were discovered. As a result, this indicates that Municipium Dardanorum primarily existed as a prehistoric settlement, and continued to develop and change to become a typical ancient Roman town during the late 1st century, and until the beginning of the 4th century AD. The settlement had all the characteristics of a Roman town. The site stretches approximately 30 hectares.

Structures 

The most significant structure in the central part of the town is the forum. It is a rectangular area oriented north-south, measuring 38 by 25 meters bounded on the east and west side with a row of seven pillars. To the east and west of the forum are two rectangular spaces, almost identical in size and method of construction. These buildings have two entrances. In the north of the forum, around the middle, between the side rooms, on a raised platform of 1.10 meters, is an important temple dedicated to Antinous, the early deceased lover of the Emperor Hadrian. After the death of Hadrian traces that resemble Antinous were erased, and only by sifting through the construction rubble was found a plaque with an inscription dedicated to Hadrian, which shows that the temple in the Forum was built in the period between 136 and 138 AD. 

South of the Forum, on a surface of 880 m2 were discovered remains of a basilica measuring 55.00x16.50 meters. The function of the basilica was closely associated with the Forum for it is known that it was used for storage of the products of lead and precious metal excavated at nearby mines at Mount Kopaonik and Rogozna. In the basilica trade and economic activities and transactions, as well as other activities were performed.  In the immediate vicinity of the river Ibër was a Roman stone bridge connecting the Municipium DD to Rogozna and the mines on the mountain.  The remains of the stone pillars and the bridge are now well recognizable, especially in the middle of the vortex.

The settlement of Municipium DD experienced a revival in the 3rd century AD, at the time of the rule of Diocletian, when he redesigned the Forum, build the basilica, erected a small bath and a range of other facilities, but the life settlement did not last long - a hundred years later Municipium DD loses its significance and disappears from the historical stage.

See also 

Roman Dardania
Roman cities in Illyria
Archaeology of Kosovo
Roman Period Sites in Kosovo
Neolithic Sites in Kosovo
Copper, Bronze and Iron Age Sites in Kosovo
Late Antiquity and Medieval Sites in Kosovo

References 

Illyrian Kosovo
Moesia
Moesia Superior
Dardanians
Dardania (Roman province)
Archaeology of Kosovo
Archaeology of Illyria
Roman towns and cities in Kosovo
Archaeological sites in Kosovo
Cultural heritage monuments in Kosovska Mitrovica District